is a multi-purpose stadium in Hiratsuka, Kanagawa, Japan. It is used mostly for football matches and is the home stadium of Shonan Bellmare. The stadium has a capacity of 15,380 spectators.

References

External links 
Shonan Bellmare stadium guide 
J. League stadium guide 

Football venues in Japan
Athletics (track and field) venues in Japan
Multi-purpose stadiums in Japan
Sports venues in Kanagawa Prefecture
Shonan Bellmare
Hiratsuka, Kanagawa
1987 establishments in Japan
Sports venues completed in 1987